

Portugal
 Angola – Manuel de Almeida e Vasconcelos, Governor of Angola (1790–1797)
 Macau – D. Vasco Luis Carneiro de Sousa e Faro, Governor of Macau (1790–1793)

Kingdom of Great Britain
 Upper Canada – John Graves Simcoe (1791–1796)
 Jamaica – 
Thomas Howard, 3rd Earl of Effingham, Governor of Jamaica (1790–1791)
Adam Williamson, Acting Governor of Jamaica (1791–1795)
 New South Wales – Arthur Phillip, Governor of New South Wales (1788–1792)

Colonial governors
Colonial governors
1791